Common oven temperatures (such as terms: cool oven, very slow oven, slow oven, moderate oven, hot oven, fast oven, etc.) are set to control the effects of baking in an oven, for various lengths of time.

Standard phrases 
{| class=wikitable style="float:right; margin-left:1em"
|-
! colspan=3 style="background-color:#F1CC66;" | Table of equivalent oven temperatures

|-
! Description      || °F || °C 
|-
| Cool oven        || 200 °F    || 90 °C
|-
| Very slow oven   || 250 °F    || 120 °C
|-
| Slow oven        || 300–325 °F || 150–160 °C
|-
| Moderately slow  || 325–350 °F || 160–180 °C
|-
| Moderate oven    || 350–375 °F || 180–190 °C
|-
| Moderately hot   || 375–400 °F || 190–200 °C
|-
| Hot oven         || 400–450 °F || 200–230 °C
|-
| Very hot oven    || 450–500 °F || 230–260 °C
|-
| Fast oven        || 450–500 °F || 230–260 °C
|}
The various standard phrases, to describe oven temperatures, include words such as "cool" to "hot" or "very slow" to "fast". For example, a cool oven has temperature set to 90 °C (200 °F), and a slow oven has a temperature range from 150–160 °C (300–325 °F). A moderate oven has a range of 180–190 °C (350–375 °F), and a hot oven has temperature set to 200–230 °C (400–450 °F). A fast oven has a range of 230–260 °C (450-500 °F) for the typical temperature.

Estimating oven temperature
Before ovens had thermometers or thermostats, these standard words were used by cooks and cookbooks to describe how hot an oven should be to cook various items. Custards require a slow oven for example, bread a moderate oven, and pastries a very hot oven. Cooks estimated the temperature of an oven by counting the number of minutes it took to turn a piece of white paper golden brown, or counting the number of seconds one could hold one's hand in the oven. Another method was to put a layer of flour or a piece of white tissue paper on a pan in the oven for five minutes. The resulting colors range from delicate brown in a slow oven through golden brown in a moderate oven to dark brown in a hot oven.

See also 
 Conversion of units
 Gas mark
 SI Units

References 

Baking
Temperature